Karen Susana Schwarz Espinoza (born 21 January 1981 in Callao, Peru) is a Peruvian model and ex-TV host. She was the co-host of Yo Soy.

Career
In 2011, Schwarz was part of the cast of the TV game show El último pasajero, hosted by Adolfo Aguilar, as one of the three "aire hostess". She also became representative, image and brand partner of Álika.

In 2012, Schwarz represented Peru in Buenos Aires Fashion Week, as an ambassador for Sedal. She then became co-host of the reality show Yo soy, again with Aguilar on Frecuencia Latina. Months later, she began to host the show Espectáculos on the same channel.

Schwarz continued as co-hostess of Yo Soy on Frecuencia Latina in 2013. She was to debut as an actress in the 2014 film Japy Ending.

Filmography

Beauty contests

Miss Perú Universo 2009 - Winner
Miss Universe 2009 - Peruvian candidate
Miss Continente Americano 2009 - Runner-up
Miss Intercontinental 2010 - First runner-up

See also
Miss Peru Universo 2009
Miss Peru

References

https://archive.today/20130416064657/http://www.elcomercio.com.pe/noticia/269190/miss-amazonas-karen-schwarz-gano-concurso-miss-peru-universo-2009
https://web.archive.org/web/20090510024828/http://peru21.pe/noticia/269184/karen-schwarz-se-convirtio-nueva-miss-peru-universo

External links
Miss Peru Universe official website

1981 births
Living people
Miss Universe 2009 contestants
Peruvian people of German descent
People from Callao
Peruvian beauty pageant winners
Peruvian female models
Peruvian Jews